Neander Lake is a lake in Chisago County, Minnesota, in the United States.

Neander Lake was named for Nels P. Neander, a pioneer settler.

See also
List of lakes in Minnesota

References

Lakes of Minnesota
Lakes of Chisago County, Minnesota